Gerhard Sperling (born 25 November 1937 in Berlin) is an East German former race walker.

Sperling represented the sports club TSC Berlin and became East German champion over 20 km in 1966, 1968, 1969 and 1971.

He  competed at the Deaflympics in 1961, 1969 and 1977 and has won five medals including three gold medals

International competitions

See also 
Deaf people in the Olympics

References

1937 births
Living people
Athletes from Berlin
East German male racewalkers
Deaf competitors in athletics
German deaf people
Olympic athletes of East Germany
Olympic athletes of the United Team of Germany
Athletes (track and field) at the 1964 Summer Olympics
Athletes (track and field) at the 1968 Summer Olympics
Athletes (track and field) at the 1972 Summer Olympics
European Athletics Championships medalists